Adrienne Garvey (born 25 April 1985) is an English-born Hong Kong rugby union player. She was a member of Hong Kong's first-ever 2017 Women's Rugby World Cup team.

Biography 
Originally from England, Garvey moved to Hong Kong with her husband Chris in 2011. She studied at Loughborough University. She made her tenth Hong Kong Sevens appearance in 2015. Garvey was named in Hong Kong's squad for the 2017 Hong Kong Women's Sevens. It was a Women's Sevens Series qualifier tournament for the 2017–18 series.

References 

Living people
1985 births
British expatriates in Hong Kong
Hong Kong rugby union players
Hong Kong female rugby union players
Hong Kong female rugby sevens players